COLAGE (originally abbreviated from Children of Lesbians and Gays Everywhere) is an organization created in 1990 by the children of several lesbian and gay male couples who felt a need for support.

COLAGE is run and operated by people of all ages who have an LGBTQ parent or parents.  Older Colagers mentor younger members, preparing them for challenges that a child may face having same-sex parents. Every summer COLAGE comes to Family Pride annual Family Week in Provincetown on Cape Cod. There, hundreds of gay families attend COLAGE meetings and workshops.

COLAGE is currently a virtual organization and has a small paid staff. The national program director is Jordan Budd.

History
COLAGE is the first organization of its kind and was originally called Just for Us. Just for Us began as a newsletter of the main six members of COLAGE. Later, six other chapters around the United States adopted that name.  The ancestry of COLAGE can be tracked to an annual conference that is sponsored each year by Gay and Lesbian Parents Coalition International (GLPCI). In 1992, the group met for three days, outside of its annual meeting, to compose a mission statement and long-term goals. Amity Buxton represented the Straight Spouse Network (SSN), which has close relations with the Family Pride Coalition (FPC), at the conference and gave presentations for the GLPCI/FPC concerning her heading of the Task Force for children through the PFLAG. Her presentation proved successful in contributing to the origins of COLAGE.

In 1995, COLAGE opened a volunteer-run national office in San Francisco. This office operated for the primary purpose of providing "support, research, media, and advocacy" for over 500 families on a mailing list of children with GLBT parents. Beginning in 1996, COLAGE included children of transgender parents and designed specific resources not available anywhere else.

In 1997, the organization had their first director on payroll with a minuscule budget.  The director, along with a determined team of youth-led volunteer committees, was able to commence a nationwide campaign that would allow them to hire another staff member in 1999.

Advocacy
In the United States, there are 6 million children who have at least one lesbian or gay parent and within these values anywhere from one to nine million children are currently being raised in same-sex parent households. Children within these households face minority problems and the ability to cope with their situation can often be overwhelming. COLAGE serves these types of children in several ways with peer support and community-building.

The process for children to become comfortable with their lifestyle is often disrupted by different outside influences such as the "negative portrayals, misinformation, and the constant public debate about LGBT rights." Another purpose of COLAGE is advocating for the lack of legal recognition of same-sex relationships to address the burden of lack of benefits or protections for LGBT families with children.  COLAGE also opposes negative media concerning the psychological disorders that surround the children of LGBT parents.

Youth Leadership and Public Education
This program of COLAGE aims to "connect constituents with media and public speaking opportunities empowering them to produce authentic representations of their experiences." YLAP (Youth Leadership and Action Program) was a COLAGE program designed to support public education and advocacy efforts for the children with LGBT parents by creating high quality arts activism materials. In 2005, the YLAP members completed In My Shoes: Stories of Youth with GLBT Parents, a documentary that profiles several adolescents with their stories, unique experiences, and their opinions about same-sex marriages. This film is used as an educational tool to reach out to youth across America in hopes to education the general public and eventually influence school policies and legislation at the state/federal level. In My Shoes: Stories of Youth with LGBT Parents won the Audience Award for Best Short at the Frameline Film Festival and is now distributed to classrooms and communities nationwide.

Advocacy and Youth Organizing
This program of COLAGE aims directly "provide tools, training, and information to engage effectively in public policy development." COLAGErs have been brought up by helping youth from an early age develop "self-awareness to social awareness to civic and political advocacy."  Specifically for this program area, a staff-led organization researches and advocates for COLAGE.  In 2004, this organization "created and distributed a state-by-state guide of issues directly affecting GLBT people and families."

See also 
 PFLAG

References

External links
 COLAGE.ORG
 Families Like Mine
 Straight Spouse Network - Resources for straight spouses
  - Other online resources for LGBT Families

Organizations established in 1989
LGBT organizations in the United States
LGBT organizations in Canada
LGBT family and peer support groups